La Leyenda is a Mexican norteña band founded in 1995 in Monterrey, Nuevo León.

Discography
 Necesito un amor (2003)
 Algo en tí (2005)
 La única estrella (2006)
 En tus manos (2007)
 Conquistándote (2009)
 Más Fuerte Que Hércules (2011)
 777 (2012) 
 La Leyenda En Vivo (2012)
 La Neta Del Planeta (2014)

References

Mexican norteño musical groups
1995 establishments in Mexico
Musical groups from Monterrey